Vanuatu requires its residents to register their motor vehicles and display vehicle registration plates. Current plates are Australian standard 372 mm × 134 mm, are white on black, and it is the duty of the owner to get the license plate made.

References

Vanuatu
Transport in Vanuatu
Vanuatu-related lists